The 2014 NASCAR K&N Pro Series East was the 28th season of the K&N Pro Series East. It began with the New Smyrna 150 presented by JEGS at New Smyrna Speedway on February 16, and ended with the Drive Sober 150 at Dover International Speedway on September 26. Dylan Kwasniewski entered the season as the defending Drivers' Champion.

Ben Rhodes won the championship with a round to spare, after amassing five race wins during the season; he also finished all bar three races inside the top-ten placings. Rhodes ultimately finished 60 points clear of his closest rival in the points standings, Cameron Hayley. Hayley finished on the podium in seven races – including five second-place finishes – but was unable to take a race win. Third place in the championship went to Gray Gaulding, who like Hayley, failed to take a race victory during 2014; his best result was a second-place finish at Bristol Motor Speedway. Three other drivers took two race wins, as Daniel Suárez won the opening two races of the season, while Scott Heckert and Austin Hill each won consecutive races, in the final four races. Other race-winning drivers were Brandon Jones, Jesse Little, Sergio Peña, Eddie MacDonald and Cole Custer.

Teams and drivers

Notes

Schedule

Notes

Results and standings

Races

Drivers' championship

(key) Bold - Pole position awarded by time. Italics - Pole position set by final practice results or rainout. * – Most laps led.

Notes
1 – Clint King, Chad Finley, Akinori Ogata, Zachary Bruenger, Beto Monteiro, Nathan Russell, J. P. Morgan, Ander Vilariño, John Salemi and Dale Quarterley received championship points, despite the fact that they did not qualify for the race.
2 – Dylan Presnell received championship points, despite the fact that he withdrew prior to the race.
3 – Scored points towards the K&N Pro Series West.

See also

 2014 NASCAR Sprint Cup Series
 2014 NASCAR Nationwide Series
 2014 NASCAR Camping World Truck Series
 2014 ARCA Racing Series
 2014 NASCAR K&N Pro Series West
 2014 NASCAR Whelen Modified Tour
 2014 NASCAR Whelen Southern Modified Tour
 2014 NASCAR Canadian Tire Series
 2014 NASCAR Toyota Series
 2014 NASCAR Whelen Euro Series

References

ARCA Menards Series East